Erik Nyström (born October 30, 1993) is a Swedish professional ice hockey player. He is currently playing with the KHL Medveščak Zagreb of the Kontinental Hockey League (KHL). Nystrom was selected by the Montreal Canadiens in the 6th round (154th overall) of the 2012 NHL Entry Draft.

Nystrom made his Elitserien debut during the 2011–12 season playing 19 games with Modo.

In August 2013 it was announced by the Hamilton Bulldogs that they had signed Nyström to a 25-game professional tryout contract (PTO).  After 18 games with the Bulldogs he was released from his PTO and signed with the Croatian KHL club KHL Medveščak Zagreb on November 25, 2013.

Career statistics

Regular season and playoffs

References

External links

1993 births
Living people
Modo Hockey players
Swedish ice hockey left wingers
Montreal Canadiens draft picks
KHL Medveščak Zagreb players
Ice hockey people from Stockholm